João Carlos Paes Mendonça (born 1938) is a Brazilian businessman. Paes Mendonça was the owner of Grupo Bompreço and is the owner of Sistema Jornal do Commercio de Comunicação, plus having control of many shopping centers in Brazil.

References

External links
 Especial João Carlos Paes Mendonça - JC OnLine/Universo Online

1938 births
Living people
Brazilian businesspeople